Percy Miller may refer to:

 Master P (Percy Robert Miller, born 1970), American rapper, actor and businessman
 Percy Miller (pitcher) (1897–1958), American Negro leagues baseball player
 Percy A. Miller Jr. (1899–1984), Speaker of the New Jersey General Assembly
 Percy Miller, Jr. (1931–2003), American minor league baseball player